Fisser is surname of Low German and Frisian origin:
 Christoph Fisser
 Martha Hendrik Fisser

See also
 SS Lina Fisser
 SS Marie Fisser
 Related surnames
 Visser, Visscher
 Vischer, Fischer

Low German surnames
Surnames of Frisian origin
Occupational surnames